The Ministry of Social Welfare (Samājakalyāṇa mantraṇālaẏa) is the government ministry of Bangladesh responsible for the programs and the provision of social, rehabilitative services to improve the physical, social, emotional and economic well-being of the disadvantaged groups.

Directorates
National Disabled Development Foundation
Bangladesh National Social Welfare Council
Department of Social Services

See also
List of Ministers of Social Welfare (Bangladesh)

References

 
Social Welfare
Welfare in Bangladesh
Social affairs ministries